Wolfgang Müller (born 19 July 1955) is a German cross-country skier. He competed in the men's 15 kilometre event at the 1980 Winter Olympics.

References

External links
 

1955 births
Living people
German male cross-country skiers
Olympic cross-country skiers of West Germany
Cross-country skiers at the 1980 Winter Olympics
People from Kronach (district)
Sportspeople from Upper Franconia